Stephen Pangburn House is a historic home located at Guilderland in Albany County, New York.  It was built in 1864 and is a two-story frame farmhouse with one story ell.  It features attic story eyebrow windows on the ell and unusual pedimented lintels at the windows and doors.

It was listed on the National Register of Historic Places in 1982.

References

Houses on the National Register of Historic Places in New York (state)
Houses completed in 1864
Houses in Albany County, New York
National Register of Historic Places in Albany County, New York